Iranian Intellectual Property Law Association (IRIPLA''') was founded to promote teaching and research in various fields of intellectual property law in Iran and to increase public awareness regarding the importance and necessity of legal protection of research results and scientific outcomes and respect for moral and economic rights of authors of literary and artistic works.

Founders 
Mahmoud Sadeghi
Hossein Safaee
Mohammad Isaee Tafreshi
Mohammad Jafar Habib Zadeh
Abdolhossein Shirudi
Mirghasem Jafarzadeh
Saeed Habiba
Hasan Mirhosseini
Elhamoddin Sharifi

References 

Professional associations based in Iran